Manuel Gonçalves (born unknown - deceased) known as Varela, was a Portuguese footballer who played as a midfielder.

External links 
 

Portuguese footballers
Association football midfielders
Sporting CP footballers
Portugal international footballers
Year of death missing
Year of birth missing
Place of birth missing